James Andrew "Jim" Burgin (born May 20, 1956) is a Republican member of the North Carolina State Senate, representing the 12th district. He was elected in the 2018 elections. Burgin previously on the Harnett County Board of Commissioners.

Political positions
Burgin supports Medicaid expansion, one of only a few Republicans in the North Carolina General Assembly to do so. During the 2021-2022 session, Burgin and Sen. Kevin Corbin announced they were working on a bill to do so.

Committee assignments

2021-2022 session
Appropriations - Health and Human Services (Chair)
Health Care (Chair)
Agriculture, Energy, and Environment
Commerce and Insurance
Pensions, Retirement and Aging
Transportation

2019-2020 session
Appropriations - Health and Human Services
Health Care
Agriculture, Energy, and Environment
State and Local Government

Electoral history

2020

2018

2012

2008

References

Living people
1956 births
People from Knoxville, Tennessee
People from Harnett County, North Carolina
University of Tennessee alumni
County commissioners in North Carolina
Republican Party North Carolina state senators
21st-century American politicians